†Heteroneritidae is an extinct taxonomic family of sea snails, marine gastropod mollusks in the superfamilia Pyramidelloidea.

Taxonomy

2005 taxonomy 
Heteroneritidae has been classified in the Pyramidelloidea within the informal group Lower Heterobranchia in the taxonomy of Bouchet & Rocroi (2005). This family has no subfamilies.

2010 taxonomy 
Jörger et al. (2010) have redefined major groups within the Heterobranchia and they moved Pyramidelloidea to Panpulmonata.

Genera 
Genera within the family Heteroneritidae include:
 Heteronerita Gründel, 1998 - type genus of the family Heteroneritidae
 Heteronerita rotundata

References